The Forgotten District is a documentary film directed by Oliver Dickinson.

Between the Caribbean Sea and the Maya Mountains lies Toledo, known as The Forgotten District of Belize, Central America. For the last 20 years, the Maya have been promoting their own ecotourism programme in order to protect their rainforest and traditions. Despite constant opposition from the government and the tourist industry, Margarita, Reyes, Chet and their friends remain strong and optimistic. The film is a tribute to their tireless efforts.

The film has been selected by numerous festivals throughout the world (i.e. Festival International du Film d’Environnement de Paris, Rodos Ecofilms Festival, Festival Cine de Bogotá, Guangzhou International Documentary Festival) and has won several awards (i.e. Jury Award and a Special Award for promoting ecotourism at the Riga International Tourfilm Festival 2010, Silver at the Zagreb Tourfilm Festival 2012, Blue Danube Award for Best Tourism Reportage at Silafest 2009).

See also
 Toledo District, Belize
 Maya peoples
 Sustainable tourism

External links
 
 
 Toledo Ecotourism Association
 Festival International du Film d'Environnement de Paris 2009
 Available on VOD 

English-language French films
Documentary films about forests and trees
2008 documentary films
2008 films
Toledo District
Documentary films about Mesoamerica
British documentary films
French documentary films
Films directed by Oliver Dickinson
2000s English-language films
2000s British films
2000s French films